Ahmadabad (also Romanized as Aḩmadābād; also known as Akhmed-oba) is a village in Dizmar-e Sharqi Rural District, Minjavan District, Khoda Afarin County, East Azerbaijan Province, Iran. At the 2011 census, its population was 167, in 40 families.

References 

Populated places in Khoda Afarin County